Béla Szekeres (born 1933) is a Hungarian cyclist. He competed in the men's sprint event at the 1952 Summer Olympics.

References

External links
 

1933 births
Living people
Hungarian male cyclists
Olympic cyclists of Hungary
Cyclists at the 1952 Summer Olympics
Cyclists from Budapest